Villbach may refer to:

Villbach (river), of Hesse, Germany
Villbach (Jossgrund), a hamlet of the municipality Jossgrund, Hesse, Germany